Highway 42 is a highway in the Canadian province of Saskatchewan. It runs from the intersection of Highway 2 and Highway 202 near Tuxford until Highway 15.

The highway also passes the communities of Marquis, Keeler, Brownlee, Eyebrow,  Central Butte, Lawson, Riverhurst, Lucky Lake and Dinsmore, Saskatchewan.

Major intersections
From south to north:

References

042